Kamla Nehru Hospital (KNH) is located in the campus of Gandhi Medical College, Bhopal overlooking the Great lake of Bhopal. It houses the Bhopal Gas tragedy related wards and department and other general department of the Medical College.

Departments
 Department of Radio diagnosis
 Department of Radio therapy
 Department of Burns and Plastic Surgery
 Department of Pediatric Surgery
 Department of Pediatric Medicine
 Department of Ophthalmology (temporarily shifted here due to construction of new super speciality block of Hamidia Hospital.
 Regional Institute of Ophthalmology
 National Institute of Research in Environmental Health
 Central Pathology Lab

Buildings and structures in Bhopal
Hospitals in Madhya Pradesh
Teaching hospitals in India
Educational institutions in India with year of establishment missing